Hiroshi Honda may refer to:

 , Japanese former handball player
 Hiroshi Honda (painter) (1910–1970), American painter